Aurai may refer to:
 Aura (mythology), also called Aurai, a Greco-Roman deity
 Aurai, Bihar Assembly constituency, a Legislative Assembly constituency in the Indian state of Bihar
 Aurai, Uttar Pradesh Assembly constituency, a Legislative Assembly constituency in the Indian state of Uttar Pradesh

See also
Auraiya
Aurail